The Buna is a short river in Bosnia and Herzegovina; it is a left bank tributary of the Neretva. Its source (Vrelo Bune), a strong karstic spring, is near the village of Blagaj, southeast of Mostar. It is best known for the Buna Spring (Vrelo Bune), one of the strongest springs in Europe and extremely cold water. The Buna flows west for approximately 9 km, starts at Blagaj and meandering through the villages of Blagaj, Kosor, Malo Polje, Hodbina and joins the Neretva at settlement Buna. The Bunica river is main left bank tributary of the Buna.

See also 
 Vrelo Bunice
 Mostarska Bijela
 Hutovo Blato
 Daorson
 List of Illyrian cities

Rivers of Bosnia and Herzegovina
Springs of Bosnia and Herzegovina
Blagaj
Upper Horizons Hydroelectric Power Stations System